Maxence Caqueret (born 15 February 2000) is a French professional footballer who plays as a midfielder for Ligue 1 club Lyon.

Club career
Caqueret is a product of the Lyon academy. He made his first team debut on 5 January 2019 in a 2–0 away win against Bourges 18 in the Coupe de France. He started the match before being replaced by Houssem Aouar after 72 minutes. On 30 November, Caqueret played his first Ligue 1 game against Strasbourg giving an assist to Maxwel Cornet in a 2–1 win. On 4 January, Caqueret scored his first professional goal in Coupe de France against Bourg-en-Bresse.

Career statistics

Honours 
Lyon
 Coupe de la Ligue runner-up: 2019–20

References

External links

 OL Web Profile
 

2000 births
Living people
People from Vénissieux
French footballers
France youth international footballers
France under-21 international footballers
Association football midfielders
Olympique Lyonnais players
Championnat National 2 players
Ligue 1 players
Sportspeople from Lyon Metropolis
Footballers from Auvergne-Rhône-Alpes